Kata Lathos (Κατά Λάθος) is a sitcom that aired on the Cypriot channel Sigma TV between September and December 2015. The show was written by Charis Aristidou and Michalis Terzis and directed by Paris Prokopiou.

Main cast

Recurring Characters

Episodes
 Episode 1: Kata Lathos...Sinantisi (Accidentally...Meeting)
 Episode 2: Kata Lathos...Atihima (Accidentally...Accident)
 Episode 3: Kata Lathos...Ikogeniako Trapezi (Accidentally...Family Dinner)
 Episode 4: Kata Lathos...Kleftis (Accidentally...Thieve)
 Episode 5: Kata Lathos...Metakomisi (Accidentally...Moving)
 Episode 6: Kata Lathos...Rantevou (Accidentally...Date)
 Episode 7: Kata Lathos...Psarema (Accidentally...Fishing)
 Episode 8: Kata Lathos...Egklimaties (Accidentally...Criminals)
 Episode 9: Kata Lathos...Hameni - Meros I (Accidentally...Lost - Part I)
 Episode 10: Kata Lathos...Hameni - Meros II (Accidentally...Lost - Part II)
 Episode 11: Kata Lathos...Baby Sitting (Accidentally...Baby Sitting)
 Episode 12: Kata Lathos...Ekatommiriouhi (Accidentally...Millionaires)
 Episode 13: Kata Lathos...Katharistria (Accidentally...Cleaner)
 Episode 14: Kata Lathos...Prosklisi (Accidentally...Invitation)
 Episode 15: Kata Lathos...Epistimones (Accidentally...Scientists)
 Episode 16: Kata Lathos...Kantada (Accidentally...Serenade)
 Episode 17: Kata Lathos...Eroto-Ktipimenoi (Accidentally...Love - Stricken)
 Episode 18: Kata Lathos...Ekpliksi (Accidentally...Surprise)
 Episode 19: Kata Lathos...Nictoperpatimata (Accidentally...Night Walks)
 Episode 20: Kata Lathos...Iko-Domes (Accidentally...House Builders)
 Episode 21: Kata Lathos...Provlepis? (Accidentally...Predictions?)
 Episode 22: Kata Lathos...Sigkiries (Accidentally...Coincidences)
 Episode 23: Kata Lathos...Mana Ex Ouranou (Accidentally...Mother From The Sky)
 Episode 24: Kata Lathos...Apagogi - Meros I (Accidentally...Abduction - Part I)
 Episode 25: Kata Lathos...Apagogi - Meros II (Accidentally...Abduction - Part II)
 Episode 26: Kata Lathos...Apokalipsis (Accidentally...Revelations)
 Episode 27: Kata Lathos...Anazitisis (Accidentally...Quest)
 Episode 28: Kata Lathos...Anakenisi (Accidentally...Renovation)
 Episode 29: Kata Lathos...Anakalipsis (Accidentally...Revelations)
 Episode 30: Kata Lathos...Sosto (Accidentally...Correctly)

2015 Cypriot television series debuts
Greek-language television shows
2015 Cypriot television series endings
Sigma TV original programming